Nagpur Lok Sabha seat is one of the 48 Lok Sabha (parliamentary) constituencies of Maharashtra state in western India. This constituency is spread over Nagpur city and some part of Nagpur district.

Vidhan Sabha segments
Presently, Nagpur Lok Sabha constituency comprises six Vidhan Sabha (legislative assembly) segments. These segments with constituency numbers and reservation (if any) are:

Members of Parliament

^ by-poll

Election results

General elections 2019

General elections 2014

General elections 2009

General elections 1957
 Anasuyabai Kale (Congress) : 105,021 votes  
 Haridas Awade (SCF) : 64,718  
 Narendra Deoghare (PSP) : 50,189

See also
Nagpur district
Ramtek Lok Sabha constituency
List of Constituencies of the Lok Sabha

Notes

External links
Nagpur lok sabha  constituency election 2019 results details

Politics of Nagpur
Lok Sabha constituencies in Maharashtra
Nagpur district